6498 Ko, provisional designation , is a stony Flora asteroid and exceptionally slow rotator from the inner regions of the asteroid belt, approximately 4 kilometers in diameter. The asteroid was discovered on 26 October 1992, by Japanese amateur astronomers Kin Endate and Kazuro Watanabe at Kitami Observatory on eastern Hokkaidō, Japan. It was named for Japanese scientist Ko Nagasawa.

Orbit and classification 

Ko is a member of the Flora family, one of the largest groups of stony asteroids in the main-belt. It orbits the Sun in the inner main-belt at a distance of 1.9–2.7 AU once every 3 years and 5 months (1,258 days). Its orbit has an eccentricity of 0.17 and an inclination of 8° with respect to the ecliptic.

A first precovery was taken at Palomar Observatory in 1954, extending the asteroid's observation arc by 38 years prior to its discovery.

Minor-planet close approaches 

Although Ko does not cross the orbit of any planet, it does make close approaches to other large asteroids, such as 29 Amphitrite, which it approached within 0.038 AU in 1915. Further close approaches will take place in 2025 and 2135 at a distance of 0.012 and 0.009 AU, respectively. On 14 November 2009, the asteroid also made a close encounter with 3 Juno at a distance of about 0.047 AU.

Physical characteristics

Slow rotator 

A rotational lightcurve of Ko was obtained from photometric observations by Czech astronomer Petr Pravec at the Ondřejov Observatory in June 2012. It rendered an exceptionally long rotation period of 500 hours with a brightness amplitude of 0.6 in magnitude.

Diameter and albedo 

The Collaborative Asteroid Lightcurve Link assumes an albedo of 0.24, derived from the Flora family's largest member and namesake, the asteroid 8 Flora, and calculates a diameter of 4.0 kilometers with an absolute magnitude of 14.16.

Naming 

This minor planet was named in honor of Japanese scientist Ko Nagasawa (born 1932), who became a keen researcher of meteors and workes for the Public Information Office at the National Astronomical Observatory of Japan, after retiring from the Earthquake Research Institute, University of Tokyo in 1994.

At the Dodaira Station, after which the minor planet 14313 Dodaira is named, Ko has obtained numerous photographic spectra of the 1965-Leonid meteor shower. The minor planet's name was proposed by the second discoverer, Kazuro Watanabe, following a suggestion by Japanese astronomer Kōichirō Tomita. The approved naming citation was published by the Minor Planet Center on 20 June 1997.

Notes

References

External links 
 Asteroid Lightcurve Database (LCDB), query form (info )
 Dictionary of Minor Planet Names, Google books
 Asteroids and comets rotation curves, CdR – Observatoire de Genève, Raoul Behrend
 Discovery Circumstances: Numbered Minor Planets (5001)-(10000) – Minor Planet Center
 
 

006498
Discoveries by Kin Endate
Discoveries by Kazuro Watanabe
Named minor planets
006498
19921026